The Extraordinary and Plenipotentiary Ambassador of Peru to the Plurinational State of Bolivia is the official representative of the Republic of Peru to the Plurinational State of Bolivia.

Both Bolivia and Peru share a common history in the fact that both nations were once part of the Inca Empire and then as part of the Spanish Empire. Relations between both countries were established soon after their independence. Since then, relations have turbulent, from a territorial dispute arising from the independence of Bolivia, to both countries allying themselves against Chile during the War of the Pacific.

Nevertheless, relations between both nations have remained close and both nations work together in South American multilateral organizations. There have been numerous visits between leaders of both nations, and Bolivia was allowed to build a port south of Peru's port of Ilo in 2010.

List of representatives

References

Bolivia
Peru